Acacia polybotrya, commonly known the western silver wattle or the hairy feather wattle, is a shrub of the genus Acacia and the subgenus Botrycephalae. It is native to an area in New South Wales and Queensland.

Description
It has smooth greenish to gray coloured bark and terete, glabrous or lightly haired branchlets. It flowers from August to November producing yellow inflorescences. After flowering thinly leathery seed pods form that are straight or curved and often twisted.

Taxonomy
The species was first formally described bu the botanist George Bentham in 1842 as a part of William Jackson Hooker's work Notes on Mimoseae, with a synopsis of species as published in the London Journal of Botany. It was reclassified as Racosperma polybotryum by Leslie Pedley in 1987 then transferred back to genus Acacia in 2001. The only other synonyms are Acacia polybotrya var. typica and Acacia polybotrya var. polybotrya.

Distribution
It is endemic from south eastern Queensland from the southern portion of the Darling Downs district and the range extends south to the central western slopes and north western plains of New South Wales as far south as Munghorn Gap Nature Reserve where it is found in a variety of habitat growing in infertile rocky, sandy or gravelly clay soils as a part of open Eucalyptus woodlands or in shrubland communities.

See also
 List of Acacia species

References

polybotrya
Flora of New South Wales
Flora of Queensland
Taxa named by George Bentham
Plants described in 1842